The 1989–90 season was the 110th season of competitive football by Rangers.

Overview
Rangers played a total of 45 competitive matches during the 1989–90 season. On 10 July when Rangers, acting on Souness' say so, purchased former Celtic striker Mo Johnston from French club Nantes for £1.5 million. The fact Rangers signed an ex-Celtic player would have been a big enough story but the fact Johnston was a high-profile Roman Catholic made the move unprecedented. The transfer angered both sides of the Old Firm's support, Rangers because Johnston was an ex-Celt and Catholic (Rangers traditionally did not sign Catholics), and Celtic fans saw Johnston as a turncoat who had already committed to re-join Celtic from Nantes before Rangers made known their interest.

When the season began, Rangers did not. Three matches played in the league, no wins and two defeats. However, the team slowly got into gear, despite only two wins from the first eight games. New arrival Johnston netted the crucial winner during an Old Firm game on 4 November 1989. Scoring the goal in the dying minutes of the match meant Johnston was all but forgiven by the Rangers support. Come May 1990, Rangers' name was on the trophy for the second time in as many seasons but the club again failed to win the Scottish Cup, losing to Celtic in the fourth round, and for once did not win the League Cup. The side lost to Aberdeen by 2–1 in the final.

In Europe they were knocked out the European Cup by German side Bayern Munich. They lost the tie 3–1 on aggregate.

Transfers

In

Out

Results
All results are written with Rangers' score first.

Scottish Premier Division

European Cup

Scottish Cup

League Cup

Appearances

See also
 1989–90 in Scottish football
 1989–90 Scottish Cup
 1989–90 Scottish League Cup
 1989–90 European Cup
 Nine in a row

Rangers F.C. seasons
Rangers
Scottish football championship-winning seasons